Kenean Markneh Maleko (Amharic: ረመዳን ዩሱፍ; born 30 March 1998) is an Ethiopian professional footballer who plays as a left-back for Ethiopian Premier League club Defence Force and the Ethiopia national team.

International career 
Maleko made his international debut with the Ethiopia national team in a 0–0 2019 Africa Cup of Nations qualification tie with Kenya on10 October 2018.

References

1998 births
People from Oromia Region
Ethiopian footballers
Ethiopia international footballers
Ethiopian Premier League players
Saint George S.C. players
Defence Force S.C. players
Living people
Ethiopia A' international footballers
2022 African Nations Championship players